Moneta is a genus of comb-footed spiders that was first described by Octavius Pickard-Cambridge in 1871.

Species
 it contains twenty-one species:
Moneta australis (Keyserling, 1890) – Australia (Queensland)
Moneta baoae Yin, 2012 – China
Moneta caudifera (Dönitz & Strand, 1906) – Russia (Far East), China, Korea, Japan
Moneta coercervea (Roberts, 1978) – Seychelles
Moneta conifera (Urquhart, 1887) – New Zealand
Moneta furva Yin, 2012 – China
Moneta grandis Simon, 1905 – India
Moneta hunanica Zhu, 1998 – China
Moneta longicauda Simon, 1908 – Australia (Western Australia)
Moneta mirabilis (Bösenberg & Strand, 1906) – China, Korea, Laos, Malaysia, Taiwan, Japan
Moneta orientalis Simon, 1909 – Vietnam
Moneta spinigera O. Pickard-Cambridge, 1871 (type) – Africa, Asia
Moneta spinigeroides (Zhu & Song, 1992) – China
Moneta subspinigera Zhu, 1998 – China
Moneta tanikawai (Yoshida, 1991) – Japan
Moneta triquetra Simon, 1889 – New Caledonia
Moneta tumida Zhu, 1998 – China
Moneta tumulicola Zhu, 1998 – China
Moneta uncinata Zhu, 1998 – China
Moneta variabilis Rainbow, 1920 – Australia (Lord Howe Is.)
Moneta yoshimurai (Yoshida, 1983) – Taiwan

In synonymy:
M. paiki (Seo, 1985) = Moneta caudifera (Dönitz & Strand, 1906)

See also
 List of Theridiidae species

References

External links

Araneomorphae genera
Taxa named by Octavius Pickard-Cambridge
Theridiidae